Quod may refer to:

 The Quod, a contemporary nickname for the English Quota System during the Napoleonic Wars
 a quod, the main playing item in the fictional sport of Quodpot in the Harry Potter universe
 Quod (board game), an abstract strategy game

The word is also common in several Latin phrases used in different (English) contexts:

 per quod
 ad quod damnum
 nemo dat quod non habet
 quod erat demonstrandum (often abbreviated "Q.E.D.")